Karanjgaon may refer to:
 Karanjgaon, Mawal, Pune district, Maharashtra, India
 Karanjgaon, Niphad, Nashik district, Maharashtra, India

See also 
 Karajgaon, Palghar district, Maharashtra, India